The Russia women's national under-19 volleyball team represents Russia in international women's volleyball competitions and friendly matches under the age 19 and it is ruled by the Russian Volleyball Federation That is a member of The Federation of International Volleyball FIVB and also a part of European Volleyball Confederation CEV.

In response to the 2022 Russian invasion of Ukraine, the International Volleyball Federation suspended all Russian national teams, clubs, and officials, as well as beach and snow volleyball athletes, from all events. The European Volleyball Confederation (CEV) also banned all Russian national teams, clubs, and officials from participating in European competition, and suspended all members of Russia from their respective functions in CEV organs.

History

Results

FIVB U19 World Championship
 Champions   Runners up   Third place   Fourth place

Europe U18 / U17 Championship
 Champions   Runners up   Third place   Fourth place

Team

Previous squad

The following was the Russian roster in the 2019 FIVB Girls' U18 World Championship.

Head coach: Svetlana Safronova

Former squads

U18 World Championship
1999 — 12th place
Kira Ostroumova, Maria Zhadan, Tatyana Aleinikova, Ekaterina Kalashnikova, Nelly Alisheva, Anastasia Yartseva, Ekaterina Karalyus, Natalia Kulikova, Elena Lisovskaya, Nadezhda Gokhshtein, Natalya Rogacheva and Olga Zhitova
2001 — 6th place
Irina Sukhova, Iuliia Morozova, Marina Pilipenko, Olga Fateeva, Marina Babeshina, Olesya Sharavskaya, Oksana Soluyancheva, Natalia Korobkova, Svetlana Surtseva, Ekaterina Margatskaya, Zhanna Demina and Oksana Semenova
2003 — 7th place
Tatiana Soldatova, Maria Borodakova, Ekaterina Osickhina, Ekaterina Gromova, Vera Ulyakina, Anna Klimakova, Anastasia Prisyagina, Ekaterina Ulanova, Anna Ovinnikova, Anastasia Markova, Anna Sotnikova and Tamara Guzeeva
2005 —  Silver medal
Elena Samoylova, Irina Kuznetsova, Elena Kovalenko, Elena Boyarkina, Tatiana Kosheleva, Natalia Dianskaya, Irina Gunbina, Natalia Nazarova, Alexandra Vinogradova, Viktoria Rusakova, Ekaterina Pankova and Yuliya Podskalnaya
2007 —  Bronze medal
Olga Efimova, Ekaterina Bogacheva, Ekaterina Pankova, Daria Pilipenko, Ksenia Kravchenko, Anna Kiseleva, Ksenia Bondar, Anastasia Shchurinova, Irina Smirnova, Tatiana Shchukina, Viktoria Chervova and Evgeniya Kondrashkina
2015 — 7th place
Angelina Lazarenko, Ksenia Smirnova, Inna Balyko, Anastasia Stalnaya, Elizaveta Kotova, Maria Bogomolova, Ksenia Pligunova, Angelina Emelina, Daria Ryseva, Asiiat Shakhmirova, Maria Vorobyeva and Alexandra Oganezova
2017 —  Bronze medal
Varvara Shepeleva, Tatiana Kadochkina, Alexandra Borisova,  Polina Shemanova, Viktoriia Pushina, Olga Zvereva, Veronika Rasputnaia, Yulia Brovkina, Irina Soboleva, Valeriya Shevchuk (c), Angelina Nikashova and Oxana Yakushina
2019 — 7th place
Elizaveta Kochurina, Valeriia Perova,  Polina Matveeva, Elizaveta Gosheva (c), Vita Akimova, Elizaveta Popova, Arina Fedorovtseva, Alexandra Murushkina, Natalia Suvorova, Valeriia Gorbunova, Natalia Slautina and Tatiana Kadochkina

References

External links
 Official website 

National women's under-18 volleyball teams
Russia national volleyball team
Women's volleyball in Russia